The 2020–21 Middle Tennessee Blue Raiders men's basketball team represented Middle Tennessee State University during the 2020–21 NCAA Division I men's basketball season. The team was led by third-year head coach Nick McDevitt, and played their home games at Murphy Center in Murfreesboro, Tennessee as members of Conference USA.

Previous season 
The Blue Raiders finished the 2019–20 season 8–23, 4–14 in C-USA play to finish in last place. They failed to qualify for the C-USA tournament.

Roster

Schedule and results

|-
!colspan=12 style=|Non-conference regular season

|-
!colspan=12 style=|CUSA regular season

|-
!colspan=9 style=| Conference USA tournament

See also
 2020–21 Middle Tennessee Blue Raiders women's basketball team

Notes

References

Middle Tennessee Blue Raiders men's basketball seasons
Middle Tennessee Blue Raiders
Middle Tennessee men's basketball
Middle Tennessee mens's basketball